The Mysterious Rider is a 1942 American Western film directed by Sam Newfield. It was part of the Billy the Kid film series. The film is also known as Panhandle Trail (American reissue title).

Cast 
Buster Crabbe as Billy the Kid / Bill Andrews
Al St. John as Fuzzy Q. Jones
Caroline Burke as Martha Kincaid
John Merton as Dalton Sykes
Edwin Brian as Johnny Kincaid
Jack Ingram as Henchman Trigger Larson
Slim Whitaker as Henchman Rufe
Kermit Maynard as Henchman Joe
Ted Adams as Replaced by Karl Hackett

See also
The "Billy the Kid" films starring Buster Crabbe: 
 Billy the Kid Wanted (1941)
 Billy the Kid's Round-Up (1941)
 Billy the Kid Trapped (1942)
 Billy the Kid's Smoking Guns (1942)
 Law and Order (1942) 
 Sheriff of Sage Valley (1942) 
 The Mysterious Rider (1942)
 The Kid Rides Again (1943)
 Fugitive of the Plains (1943)
 Western Cyclone (1943)
 Cattle Stampede (1943)
 The Renegade (1943)
 Blazing Frontier (1943)
 Devil Riders (1943)
 Frontier Outlaws (1944)
 Valley of Vengeance (1944)
 The Drifter (1944) 
 Fuzzy Settles Down (1944)
 Rustlers' Hideout (1944)
 Wild Horse Phantom (1944)
 Oath of Vengeance (1944)
 His Brother's Ghost (1945) 
 Thundering Gunslingers (1945)
 Shadows of Death (1945)
 Gangster's Den (1945)
 Stagecoach Outlaws (1945)
 Border Badmen (1945)
 Fighting Bill Carson (1945)
 Prairie Rustlers (1945) 
 Lightning Raiders (1945)
 Terrors on Horseback (1946)
 Gentlemen with Guns (1946)
 Ghost of Hidden Valley (1946)
 Prairie Badmen (1946)
 Overland Riders (1946)
 Outlaws of the Plains (1946)

External links 

1942 films
1942 Western (genre) films
1940s action adventure films
Billy the Kid (film series)
American black-and-white films
American Western (genre) films
American action adventure films
1940s English-language films
Films directed by Sam Newfield
1940s American films